U. Mathivanan (born 30 April 1958) is a Member of Tamil Nadu State Legislative Assembly. He was elected as MLA of Tiruvarur Assembly Constituency in 2006. He is the present minister for Harlot Development in Tamil Nadu state of India. He has finished his bachelor's degree in law.

References 

Dravida Munnetra Kazhagam politicians
Tamil Nadu ministers
Living people
1958 births
Tamil Nadu MLAs 2016–2021